Critters is a 1986 American science fiction comedy horror film directed by Stephen Herek in his directorial debut, and co-written with Domonic Muir. It stars Dee Wallace, M. Emmet Walsh, Billy "Green" Bush and Scott Grimes in his film debut. The plot follows a group of small, furry aliens with carnivorous behavior escaping from two shape-shifting bounty hunters, landing in a small countryside town to feast on its inhabitants.

Although widely believed to have been inspired by the success of Joe Dante's 1984 film Gremlins, Herek has refuted this in interviews, pointing out that the script was written by Muir long before Gremlins went into production and subsequently underwent rewrites to reduce the apparent similarities between the two films. The film grossed $13.6 million during its release in the United States, and spawned a Critters franchise consisting of three sequels and a web series titled Critters: A New Binge released on Shudder. The fifth entry Critters Attack! serves as a reboot of the series.

Plot 
On an asteroid prison, a group of dangerous aliens known as Krites are set to be transported to another station. The Krites engineer an escape and hijack a ship, prompting the warden to hire two shape-changing bounty hunters to pursue them to Earth. Studying life on Earth via various satellite television transmissions, the first bounty hunter assumes the form of rock star Johnny Steele, while the second remains undecided, thus retaining his blank, featureless head.

On a rural Kansas farm, the Brown family sits down to breakfast. Father Jay and mother Helen send teenage daughter April and younger son Brad off to school while waiting on mechanic Charlie McFadden. A former baseball pitcher, Charlie has become the town drunk and crackpot, with claims of alien abductions foretold by messages through his fillings.

Playing with overly potent self-made fireworks and Charlie's slingshot, Brad takes the blame when Charlie accidentally shoots April and for Brad’s punishment he gets no dinner for the day. On the roof that evening, Brad mistakes the Critters' crashing spaceship for a meteorite; Jay and Brad investigate and interrupt the creatures consuming a cow. The creatures then kill and feed on a local police officer (later the second bounty hunter takes his form and the pair take his police car), and later besiege the farm and cut its electrical connection. While checking the circuit breaker, Jay is attacked by one of the Critters and, being severely wounded, just barely manages to escape.

In the barn, April is about to have sex with her boyfriend Steve when he is killed by the one of the Critters; the creature itself is slain when it devours one of Brad's lit firecrackers. The remaining Critters sabotage the Browns' and Steve's cars, forcing the Browns to hole up inside the main house. Meanwhile, the two bounty hunters search the town for the Critters, causing a panic at the church and bowling alley, with the second hunter assuming the form of various townspeople, including Charlie. Brad escapes the farm to get help and runs into the bounty hunters, and upon learning of their true nature and intentions, he leads them to the Critters' location.

The last surviving Critters kidnap April and return to their ship when the bounty hunters arrive, and attempt to flee. Charlie and Brad manage to rescue April, but Brad drops a large firecracker he intended to use to destroy the ship when the Critters discover their escape. Just as the Critters take off and destroy the farmhouse out of spite, Charlie throws a Molotov cocktail made from his whiskey bottle into the ship, causing a fire which detonates the cracker and kills the Critters. The bounty hunters leave in their ship after giving Brad a handheld device to contact them in case of future invasion, and also restore the house. Unbeknownst to them, Critter eggs can be seen in the barn inside a chicken's nest that seem to be ready to hatch.

Cast 
 Dee Wallace as Helen Brown
 M. Emmet Walsh as Harv
 Billy "Green" Bush as Jay Brown
 Scott Grimes as Brad Brown
 Nadine van der Velde as April Brown
 Don Keith Opper as Charlie McFadden
 Lin Shaye as Sally
 Billy Zane as Steve Elliot
 Ethan Phillips as Jeff Barnes
 Terrence Mann as Ug / Johnny Steele
 Jeremy Lawrence as Reverend Miller / Preacher

Production 
Herek began a friendship with Muir while working as assistant editors on City Limits (1985). When Herek was looking for his next project, Muir offered him his screenplay for Critters. Herek loved Muir's script and felt it would be fun to make a film that was "a very smart homage to 50's B-movies." After working on the script, he successfully pitched it to Sho Films. Despite being set in Kansas, principal photography began in Valencia, California in July 1985 on a six-week shooting schedule.

Special effects coordinator Chuck Stewart hired Joseph Lombardi as a consultant for the scene of the barn exploding, where they rigged second-floor ceiling with Primacord that carried an explosive charge inside it. The sequence of the Critter swallowing a cherry bomb was controlled by puppeteers who were positioned below in a hayloft to operate the stomach and eye movements. Crew member Dwight Roberts commented that it took some effort to coordinate the Critters’ bulging stomach and eyes as it kneeled over in the hay due to the number of people needed to articulate it.

The role of Charlie was specifically written for Don Opper, a close friend of Muir and Herek. Opper, who was a writer with no real acting experience, took the role due to his friendship with the filmmakers.

Release 
Critters was theatrically released on April 11, 1986 by New Line Cinema, opening across the United States to 633 theaters. It earned $1,618,800 in its opening weekend, and ultimately grossed $13,167,232 at the box office.

Reception

Critical response 
On review aggregator website Rotten Tomatoes, the film has a 50% approval rating based on 50 reviews, with an average of 5.4/10. The site's consensus reads: "While Critters ekes out some fun from a game cast and screwball tone, the titular monsters fail to deliver the credible menace that makes a creature feature satisfying". Roger Ebert of the Chicago Sun-Times rated the film three out of four stars: "What makes Critters more than a ripoff are its humor and its sense of style. This is a movie made by people who must have had fun making it".

Marylynn Uricchio, film critic for the Pittsburgh Post-Gazette described the film as an enjoyable, if unoriginal, low budget monster movie. Uricchio wrote: "Critters isn't a memorable or even very slick movie, but it is good fun. What it lacks in substance it makes up for with a perverse kind of charm". Caryn James of The New York Times complained that the movie lacked humor and suspense: "Critters just doesn't make the audience laugh or jump often enough".

Alex Stewart reviewed Critters for White Dwarf #83, and stated that "Critters scuttled by quite pleasantly. Nothing really stands out, despite M. Emmet Walsh as the sweaty sheriff, and a scene wherein a couple of Heavy Metal bounty hunters blow away a baptist church, but the film actually thinks through how the Browns react, as a family, to the anti-social little aliens".

Home video 
The film was released on VHS and LaserDisc by RCA/Columbia Pictures Home Video after its theatrical release. In September 1997, New Line Home Video re-released the film on VHS. New Line Home Entertainment released Critters on DVD in 2003, and was re-released in a set containing all four Critters films by Warner Bros. in 2010.

Scream Factory released all four Critters films in a set on Blu-ray in November 2018.

Web series 
Warner Bros. produced a reboot web series based on the Critters films. Critters: A New Binge premiered on Shudder on March 21, 2019.

References

External links 

 
 
 
 
 

1986 horror films
1986 films
1980s science fiction films
1980s comedy horror films
American science fiction horror films
American space adventure films
American comedy horror films
American monster movies
Films scored by David Newman
Films directed by Stephen Herek
Puppet films
Films about shapeshifting
Films set on farms
Films set in Kansas
Films set in the 1980s
Films shot in Kansas
Films shot in California
1986 directorial debut films
1980s monster movies
Alien invasions in films
Critters (franchise)
New Line Cinema films
1986 comedy films
1980s English-language films
1980s American films